Astbury is a surname. Notable people with the surname include:

Andrew Astbury, English swimmer
Ian Astbury, English rock singer
Jill Astbury, Australian researcher into violence against women
William Astbury, English physicist and molecular biologist
David Astbury, Australian Rules footballer

See also
Newbold Astbury, often just Astbury, a village in Cheshire